The Minister of State at the Department of Tourism, Culture, Arts, Gaeltacht, Sport and Media is a junior ministerial post in the Department of Tourism, Culture, Arts, Gaeltacht, Sport and Media of the Government of Ireland who may perform functions delegated by the Minister for Tourism, Culture, Arts, Gaeltacht, Sport and Media. A Minister of State does not hold cabinet rank.

There are currently two Ministers of State, who were appointed in 2022:
Thomas Byrne, TD – Minister of State with special responsibility for Sport and Physical Education; and
Patrick O'Donovan, TD – Minister of State with special responsibility for the Gaeltacht.

List of Ministers of State

References

Tourism
Department of Tourism, Culture, Arts, Gaeltacht, Sport and Media